Grevillea leucopteris, also known as old socks or white plume grevillea, is a species of flowering plant in the family Proteaceae and is endemic to the south-west of Western Australia. It is a spreading, bushy shrub with divided leaves with erect, linear lobes and clusters of white to cream-colured flowers displayed above the foliage.

Description
The flowers sometimes have a strong, unpleasant smell.

Taxonomy
Grevillea leucopteris was first formally described in 1855 by Carl Meissner in Hooker's Journal of Botany and Kew Garden Miscellany from specimens collected by James Drummond. The specific epithet (leucopteris) means "white-winged", referring to the seeds.

Distribution and habitat
Old socks grows in heath and shrubland and is found from the lower Murchison River to near Marchagee in the Avon Wheatbelt, Geraldton Sandplains, Swan Coastal Plain and Yalgoo bioregions of south-western Western Australia.

References

leucopteris
Endemic flora of Western Australia
Eudicots of Western Australia
Proteales of Australia
Taxa named by Carl Meissner
Plants described in 1855